{{DISPLAYTITLE:C13H16O7}}
The molecular formula C13H16O7 (molar mass: 284.26 g/mol, exact mass: 284.0896 u) may refer to:

 Benzoyl-β-D-glucoside
 Helicin